The Iputhou Pakhangba Laishang or the Ibudhou Pakhangba Laishang may refer to:

 Pakhangba Temple, Kangla
 Pakhangba Temple, Kakching Garden

Religious buildings and structures disambiguation pages